Kunt and the Gang is a British dark musical comedian from Basildon, Essex, who started performing in 2003. He is also known for founding the spin-off project The Kunts, whose songs entitled "Boris Johnson Is a Fucking Cunt" and "Boris Johnson Is Still a Fucking Cunt" both reached number five in the UK Singles Chart for Christmas 2020 and 2021.

Kunt began his career by making various crude synthpop songs related to sexual intercourse and controversial public figures from 2003 to 2016. He also releases under Kunt and the Gang Presents (when releasing parody musicals), and occasionally releases music under the hand puppet pseudonym, Little Kunt.

Following numerous years playing at smaller venues, and building a niche audience, in 2010, his act first reached chart success when his single "Use My Arsehole as a Cunt (The Nick Clegg Story)" reached number No. 66 in the UK Singles Chart at Christmas time. The following year, another single, "Fucksticks (Royal Wedding Souvenir Version)", also entered the same chart, this time at number No. 63.

He released ten studio albums before retiring his main act on a full-time basis in 2016, and published an autobiography in December 2018.

History 
His act generated popularity through performing at a number of pubs and attracting the attention of national magazines. He would then make content for early social networking platforms, predominately MySpace; and proclaims himself a "minor internet hit singer" who used social networking "before the thought police took it over". Despite mainly being a singular comedian, "and the Gang" in his stage name is designed to incorporate his characters such as hand-puppet "Little Kunt" who is referred to in numerous songs.

In 2019, he returned with an album featuring French versions of many of his "minor internet hits". Kunt and the Gang's early work is best known for its simple electronic production and controversial lyrical content, dealing with such taboo subjects as masturbation and sexual fantasies. Kunt's later work took a darker turn, following the Operation Yewtree police investigation, often touching on the subject of paedophilia and featured several ironic tributes to recently deceased celebrities.

Prior to his musical work, Kunt was a council worker in Basildon, in 2003.

The Kunts 
In December 2020, Kunt, performing with his newly formed punk band, The Kunts, joined the race for the Christmas number one single again, with a short song about Prime Minister Boris Johnson called "Boris Johnson Is a Fucking Cunt". Its rivals in the 2020 race were "Don't Stop Me Eatin'" by LadBaby (a parody cover of "Don't Stop Believin'" by Journey, which also featured Ronan Keating on some versions), Russ Abbott's "Atmosphere", former chart toppers Justin Bieber and The Lewisham & Greenwich NHS Choir (teaming up for a version of Bieber's "Holy"), Liam Gallagher's "All You’re Dreaming Of" and Ed Sheeran's "Afterglow". The band were backed in the race by Black Mirror's Charlie Brooker, as well as Glen Matlock of the Sex Pistols and like LadBaby, also released additional versions of the song, including a censored sausage roll based version.

The song about Boris Johnson was revealed on BBC Radio 1 by Vick Hope and Katie Thistleton on 20 December 2020. During the show, the presenters did not mention the song's title or play it on air because of the offensive language in it, stating: "Now at 19 we've got a track about Boris Johnson that has so many bad words in it we can't play it on daytime Radio 1." The record was a new entry at number 19, with LadBaby at number 1, climbing to number 8 the next day. On 23 December 2020, it was reported that a number of bookmakers had put odds on the record being the Christmas number one at 8/1, after it had become the second most downloaded song on iTunes and Amazon. The song ultimately reached number 5 on the Christmas chart, after accumulating 45,119 sales, and unlike many of the other Christmas campaign singles (such as rivals LadBaby) made the Official Audio Streaming Chart as well.

In November 2021, the Kunts launched an online campaign to get their single "Boris Johnson Is Still a Fucking Cunt" to Christmas number one. The song was released on 17 December 2021. The song reached number 5 in the Christmas midweek chart. During this campaign the band made numerous references to similarly subversive act The KLF, including in the music video (based, along with the song, on "Doctorin' the Tardis") and in promotional imagery, which shows Kunt and the band reading The Manual - a book written by The KLF as "The Timelords". Similarly to their previous hit, The Kunts song for 2021 has several mixes, some of which feature other guest artists. Both songs have radio-friendly versions with no foul language, substituting the phrase “fucking cunt” for “sausage roll.” It is believed this is made in reference to LadBaby, who have had three previous number one Christmas singles based around sausage rolls. While the 2020 single had 23 different mixes, the release for 2021 has scaled this back to 13. The song reached number 5 in the Christmas chart.

On 27 May 2022, The Kunts released "Prince Andrew Is a Sweaty Nonce", with the aim to get the song to number two for the Jubilee charts.

On 16 December 2022, The Kunts returned with "Fuck the T*ries", in a third attempt to claim the Christmas number-one; the song ranked seventh in the chart.

Shannon Matthews: The Musical 
Theatre troupe Tuppence Ha'penny performed Shannon Matthews: The Musical (based on the 2010 album) at the 2022 Edinburgh Festival Fringe. In September 2022, a film version was crowdfunded via Kickstarter. The funding goal was reached within 24 hours.

Discography

Charted singles

Other songs

Albums

Compilation albums

References

External links
 Official website
 Interview on b3ta.co.uk
 Use My Arsehole As A C*nt (The Nick Clegg Story) video

British comedy musical groups
English synth-pop groups
English punk rock groups